Alarud (also Romanized as ‘Alārūd and A‘lārūd; also known as Alarva and Alārwah) is a village in Chavarzaq Rural District, Chavarzaq District, Tarom County, Zanjan Province, Iran. At the time of the 2006 census, its population was 170, in 36 families.

References 

Populated places in Tarom County